Jan Káňa (born March 22, 1990) is a Czech professional ice hockey player who currently plays for HC RT Torax Poruba of the Czech 1. Liga. He is the younger brother of former Columbus Blue Jackets player Tomáš Káňa.

Káňa previously played 244 games in the Czech Extraliga with HC Vítkovice.

References

External links

1990 births
Living people
Brest Albatros Hockey players
Czech ice hockey forwards
AZ Havířov players
SK Horácká Slavia Třebíč players
LHK Jestřábi Prostějov players
P.E.I. Rocket players
HC Slovan Ústečtí Lvi players
Sportspeople from Ostrava
Hokej Šumperk 2003 players
HC Vítkovice players
Czech expatriate ice hockey players in Germany
Czech expatriate ice hockey players in Canada
Expatriate ice hockey players in France
Czech expatriate sportspeople in France